Conrad Dreher (1859–1944) was a German stage actor. He also appeared in several silent films.

Selected filmography

 King Krause (1919)
 My Leopold (1919)
 Hasemann's Daughters (1920)
 Doctor Klaus (1920)

References

Bibliography 
 Grange, William. Cultural Chronicle of the Weimar Republic. Scarecrow Press, 2008.

External links 
 

1859 births
1944 deaths
German male film actors
German male silent film actors
20th-century German male actors
German male stage actors
Male actors from Munich